Wilfred Spence Field (April 29, 1915 in Winnipeg, Manitoba — March 17, 1979) was a professional ice hockey defencemen who played 215 games in the National Hockey League between 1936 and 1945. He played for the New York Americans, Brooklyn Americans, Montreal Canadiens, and Chicago Black Hawks. The rest of his career, which lasted from 1935 to 1951, was spent in various minor leagues.

Career statistics

Regular season and playoffs

Awards and achievements
Turnbull Cup MJHL Championship (1935)
Memorial Cup Championship (1935)
Calder Cup (AHL) Championship (1946)
Honoured Member of the Manitoba Hockey Hall of Fame

References

External links

Wilf Field's biography at Manitoba Hockey Hall of Fame

1915 births
1979 deaths
Brooklyn Americans players
Buffalo Bisons (AHL) players
Canadian ice hockey defencemen
Chicago Blackhawks players
Montreal Canadiens players
New Haven Eagles players
New York Americans players
Providence Reds players
Seattle Seahawks (ice hockey) players
Ice hockey people from Winnipeg
Winnipeg Monarchs players